Demetri Terzopoulos  is an Academy Award winning Greek-Canadian-American computer scientist, university professor, author, and entrepreneur. He is best known for pioneering the physics-based approach to computer graphics and vision that has helped unify these two fields, and for introducing Deformable Models, among them the seminal Active Contour Models, to graphics, vision, medical imaging, and other domains; he is also known for his artificial life research on realistic animal and human modeling and simulation, encompassing musculoskeletal biomechanics, neuromuscular and neuro-sensorimotor control, and artificial intelligence. He has been a professor of computer science, electrical and computer engineering, and mathematics, and has taught courses in computer graphics, computer vision, scientific computing, and artificial intelligence/life at three universities. He is currently a Distinguished Professor and Chancellor's Professor of Computer Science in the Henry Samueli School of Engineering and Applied Science at the University of California, Los Angeles, where he directs the UCLA Computer Graphics & Vision Laboratory.

Education

Terzopoulos was educated at McGill University where he was awarded an Honours Bachelor of Engineering degree with Distinction in 1978 and a Master of Engineering degree, advised by Steven W. Zucker, in 1980, both in electrical engineering. He went on to study at the Massachusetts Institute of Technology, where he was awarded a PhD degree in Artificial Intelligence in 1984 for computer vision research on the computation of visible-surface representations, advised by Shimon Ullman and J. Michael Brady. His university education was fully funded by two NSERC Canada and two Quebec government postgraduate scholarships in addition to two McGill University J.W. McConnell undergraduate scholarships.

Career and research

Following his PhD studies, Terzopoulos was a research scientist at the MIT Artificial Intelligence Laboratory, a program leader at Schlumberger research centres in Palo Alto, California, and Austin, Texas, Professor of Computer Science and Professor of Electrical and Computer Engineering at the University of Toronto, and Professor of Computer Science and Mathematics at the Courant Institute of Mathematical Sciences of New York University, where he held a Lucy and Henry Moses Endowed Professorship in Science. He then moved to UCLA, where he has been Chancellor's Professor of Computer Science since 2005 as well as Distinguished Professor since 2012.

Since 2016, Terzopoulos has been Co-Founder and Chief Scientist of VoxelCloud, Inc., a multinational healthcare AI company with offices in Los Angeles and Shanghai. He has held adjunct, visiting, consultancy, part-time, and internship positions at Schlumberger, IBM, Digital Equipment Corporation, Intel, Bell-Northern Research, the National Research Council of Canada, Ontario Tech University, Paris Dauphine University, and Shanghai Jiao Tong University.

Terzopoulos' research interests are primarily in computer graphics, computer vision, medical imaging, computer-aided design, and artificial intelligence/life. He has authored or co-authored more than 400 scientific publications, including several volumes, spanning these fields, 19 of which have been recognized with outstanding paper awards, and has delivered more than 500 invited talks worldwide about his research,
among them well over 100 distinguished lectures and keynote/plenary addresses.

Terzopoulos has served on review and advisory committees at DARPA (United States), the National Science Foundation (United States), the National Institutes of Health (United States), the National Academies (United States), the Natural Sciences and Engineering Research Council (Canada), and the Max Planck Institute for Informatics (Germany).

Awards and recognition

Terzopoulos was awarded a Guggenheim Fellowship in 2009. He is or was an ACM Fellow, a Fellow of the Institute of Electrical and Electronics Engineers (IEEE), a Fellow of the Royal Society (FRS) of London, a Fellow of the Royal Society of Canada (FRSC), a Fellow of the Canadian Institute for Advanced Research (CIFAR), a Distinguished Fellow of the International Engineering and Technology Institute (IETI), a Fellow of the Asia-Pacific Artificial Intelligence Association (AAIA), and a member of the European Academy of Sciences, the New York Academy of Sciences, Sigma Xi, and the Hellenic Institute of Advanced Studies (HIAS).

In 2020, the IEEE Computer Society awarded Terzopoulos its Computer Pioneer Award "for a leading role in developing computer vision, computer graphics, and medical imaging through pioneering research that has helped unify these fields and has impacted related disciplines within and beyond computer science".

Terzopoulos was elected a Fellow of the Royal Society (FRS) in 2014. His certificate of election and candidature reads: 

In 2013, at the International Conference on Computer Vision (ICCV), Terzopoulos was awarded a Helmholtz Prize for his 1987 ICCV paper with Kass and Witkin entitled "Snakes: Active contour models", which received a Marr Prize citation in 1987.

In 2007, at the International Conference on Computer Vision (ICCV), Terzopoulos was awarded the inaugural IEEE PAMI Computer Vision Distinguished Researcher Award for his "pioneering and sustained research on deformable models and their applications". Deformable Models, a term he coined in his computer vision and graphics research work, is listed in the IEEE Thesaurus and IEEE Taxonomy (Systems engineering and theory → Modeling → Deformable models).

In 2006, at the 78th Academy Awards, Terzopoulos won an Academy Award for Technical Achievement from the Academy of Motion Picture Arts and Sciences with John Platt for "their pioneering work in physically-based computer-generated techniques used to simulate realistic cloth in motion pictures"; furthermore, their 1987 ACM SIGGRAPH Conference paper entitled "Elastically deformable models" was recognized by the Academy as "a milestone in computer graphics, introducing the concept of physically-based techniques to simulate moving, deforming objects".

In 2006, Terzopoulos was elected a Fellow of the Royal Society of Canada by its Academy of Science, whose short citation reads: 

In 2002, Terzopoulos was inducted as an inaugural Member of The European Academy of Sciences with the citation "Elected for outstanding and lasting contributions to computer science and pioneering developments in the field of computer vision."; he resigned from the academy in 2012.

Terzopoulos was awarded a Canadian Institute for Advanced Research (CIFAR) Artificial Intelligence and Robotics Fellowship (1989–1995), a Natural Sciences and Engineering Research Council of Canada E.W.R. Steacie Memorial Fellowship (1996–1998), and a Canada Council for the Arts Killam Research Fellowship (1998–2000). The Canadian Image Processing and Pattern Recognition Society (CIPPRS) cited him for his "outstanding contributions to research and education in Image Understanding" with its Young Investigator Award (1998) as well as with its Lifetime Achievement Award for Research Excellence (2015). He is the recipient of six University of Toronto Faculty of Arts and Science Dean's Excellence Awards.

In 1973, Terzopoulos was awarded the Governor General's Academic Medal and Centennial Fund Scholarship by the High School of Montreal.

Terzopoulos' former students and postdocs have won significant awards for their work, among them the ACM Doctoral Dissertation Award in 1996 to Xiaoyuan Tu.

See also
Active contour model

References

External links
 Personal website of Demetri Terzopoulos
 Curriculum vitae of Demetri Terzopoulos

Living people
Fellows of the Royal Society
Canadian Fellows of the Royal Society
Fellows of the Royal Society of Canada
Fellows of the Association for Computing Machinery
Fellow Members of the IEEE
Academy Award for Technical Achievement winners
Computer graphics researchers
Computer graphics professionals
Computer vision researchers
Artificial intelligence researchers
McGill University Faculty of Engineering alumni
Computer scientists
Greek computer scientists
Canadian computer scientists
American computer scientists
University of California faculty
University of California, Los Angeles faculty
UCLA Henry Samueli School of Engineering and Applied Science faculty
Courant Institute of Mathematical Sciences faculty
Academic staff of the University of Toronto
MIT School of Engineering alumni
Massachusetts Institute of Technology alumni
High School of Montreal alumni
Year of birth missing (living people)
People from Bel Air, Los Angeles
People from Big Bear Lake, California